Bream are species of freshwater and marine fish belonging to a variety of genera including Abramis (e.g., A. brama, the common bream), Acanthopagrus,  Argyrops, Blicca, Brama, Chilotilapia, Etelis, Lepomis, Gymnocranius, Lethrinus, Nemipterus, Pharyngochromis, Rhabdosargus, Scolopsis, or Serranochromis.

Although species from all of these genera are called "bream", the term does not imply a degree of relatedness between them. Fish termed "bream" tend to be narrow, deep-bodied species. The name is a derivation of the  Middle English word breme, of Old French origin.

The term sea bream is sometimes used for gilt-head bream (Sparus aurata), (orata in Italy, dorada in Spain) or porgies (both family Sparidae)  or pomfrets (family Bramidae) .

See also
 Porgie fishing
 Bluegill, sometimes called 'bream'

References

External links
Yellowfin Bream (NSW Department of Primary Industries website)
Black Bream (NSW Department of Primary Industries website)

Fish common names
Commercial fish